Zinder Region is one of the seven regions of Niger; the capital of the region is Zinder. The region covers 145,430 km². It is the most populous province of Niger.

History
Numerous Palaeolithic and Neolithic remains, as well as cave paintings, have been found in the Termit Massif.

Zinder was the centre of the Sultanate of Damagaram, a powerful sultanate which dominated much of the surrounding region from the mid-18th century until the French conquest in the 1890s. Zinder was initially the capital of the Niger territory, however this was moved to Niamey in 1926 and thereafter Zinder declined in importance, though it remains an important regional centre.

Geography

Zinder Region is located in the southeast of Niger and covers 145,430 km². It borders Agadez Region to the north, Diffa Region to the east, Nigeria to the south (specifically, the states of Yobe, Jigawa and Katsina), and Maradi Region to the west. The landscape is primarily Sahelian in the south, merging into the Sahara desert in the north of the region. The terrain is predominantly flat, except for the Koutous Hills, which lie north of Kelle, and the Termit Massif in the far north of the region.

Settlements
Zinder is the regional capital; other major settlements include Alakoss, Albarkaram, Bande, Boune, Dakoussa, Dan-Barto, Dantchiao, Daouche, Dogo-Dogo, Falenko, Gaffati, Gamou, Garagoumsa, Gouchi, Gouna, Goure, Guidiguir, Hamdara, Ichirnawa, Kantche, Kelle, Kolleram, Kourni, Kwaya, Magaria, Malawa, Matameye, Mirriah, Moa, Ollelewa, Sassoumbroum, Tanout, Tenhya, Tesker, Tsaouni, Yaouri and Yekoua.

Administrative subdivisions

Zinder was divided into 5 Departments:
 Goure Department
 Magaria Department
 Matameye Department
 Mirriah Department
 Tanout Department

Of the 27 administrative stations (postes administratifs) of Niger which were set out in a law dated 1 August 2011 to become departments and for which the appointment of prefects on 29 February 2012 completed the conversion, the following 5 are in Zinder region.
 Belbédji Department
 Damagaram Takaya Department
 Dungass Department
 Takiéta Department
 Tesker Department

So, Zinder now has 10 departments.

Demographics
As of 2012 the population of the Region was 3,539,764. The main ethnolinguistic groups are various Arab groups, Fulani, Hausa, Kanuri, Dazaga Toubou and Tuareg groups such as the Tayart Tamajeq. The Tagdal language, thought to be a mixed Songhay-Tuareg language, is also spoken.

Governors
 Yahaya Yandaka - 2013-16 
 Issa Moussa - 2016–present

See also
Regions of Niger
Departments of Niger
Communes of Niger

References

External links

 
Regions of Niger